Albertus is a glyphic serif display typeface designed by Berthold Wolpe in the period 1932 to 1940 for the British branch of the printing company Monotype. Wolpe named the font after Albertus Magnus, the thirteenth-century German philosopher and theologian.

Wolpe studied as a metal engraver, and Albertus was modelled to resemble letters carved into bronze. The face began as titling capitals. Eventually a lowercase roman was added, and later a strongly cursive, narrow italic. Albertus has slight glyphic serifs. It is available in light and italic varieties.

The project began in 1932. Titling caps were released first, and the Monotype Recorder of summer 1935 presented the capitals as an advance showing. Other characters and a lower case were added by 1940. Albertus has remained popular since its release and since the end of mass use of metal type phototypesetting and digital versions have been released.

Characteristics 
 In the uppercase "M" the middle strokes descend only partway, not reaching the baseline, in the default version.
 The uppercase "U" has a stem on the right side.
 Figures are lining.

In the metal type period, Albertus was offered with alternate characters, including a non-descending 'J' that stops at the baseline, an 'M' that reaches the baseline, and a different ampersand, similar to that used on Dwiggins' Metro.

Wolpe later designed Pegasus, a spiky serif design intended to complement Albertus with more body text-oriented proportions. It was less popular and had faded in popularity by the end of the metal type period, although Matthew Carter digitised it and added a bold and italic in 1980 as part of a commemorative exhibition project on Wolpe's work.

Use 

Albertus is used for the street name signs in the City of London, City of London Corporation and London Borough of Lambeth (where Wolpe resided until his death in 1989). Wolpe frequently used it in book jackets he designed for the London publisher Faber and Faber. It has also been used in many other publications. 

Outside of publications an adapted version of Albertus is particularly known for its use in surreal British Television series The Prisoner (1967–68), where it was used for all signage in the show's surreal prison village setting, as well as for the series' logo. The key adaptations were the removal of the dots from 'i's and 'j's and an uncial-style 'e'. It is also used for the title card on the American television series How to Get Away with Murder and was the typeface for Electronic Arts from 1999-2006. It is also known for its use by director John Carpenter in the opening credits of several of his films, including Escape from New York, The Thing, Big Trouble in Little China, Prince of Darkness, and They Live.

British band Coldplay used the Albertus Medium variant on the album covers and subsequent single releases associated with their first three albums, Parachutes, A Rush of Blood to the Head, and X&Y.

Premier League team Liverpool F.C. uses the font in the club's brand, ranging from their crest, media, memorabilia and fashion products.

Major League Soccer team Charlotte Football Club uses the font in their brand, including their crest and logotype.

Australian drum and bass band Pendulum used the Albertus Medium variant on the artwork for "Propane Nightmares", "Granite", "Showdown", and "The Other Side".

Uncharted uses the Albertus medium variant in of all the releases.

Resident Evil: Welcome to Raccoon City uses the font in the film, a tribute to John Carpenter.

Digitisations 
Monotype released an updated digital version of Albertus, named Albertus Nova, in 2017. It was digitised by Toshi Omagari as part of a Berthold Wolpe Collection series that included Pegasus and three other Wolpe typefaces. Monotype promoted the digitisation with an exhibition at the Type Museum in London. Omagari added a number of alternates, including metal type alternates, an 'A' based on Wolpe's lettering and an uncial 'e' used in the production design of The Prisoner.

Monotype's previous digital version is also available and Albertus digitisations have also been sold by Adobe, Bitstream, Fontsite, SoftMaker and others.
Bitstream's version is called Flareserif 821.

URW++ released a lookalike version known as A028 for free for use with Ghostscript and TeX. Featuring medium and extra-bold weights but no italics, A028 is widely available on Linux systems and other open source environments.

See also 
 Carter Sans (2011), by Matthew Carter and influenced by Albertus

References 

 Blackwell, Lewis. 20th Century Type. Yale University Press: 2004. .
 Fiedl, Frederich, Nicholas Ott and Bernard Stein. Typography: An Encyclopedic Survey of Type Design and Techniques Through History. Black Dog & Leventhal: 1998. .
 Jaspert, W. Pincus, W. Turner Berry and A.F. Johnson. The Encyclopædia of Type Faces. Blandford Press Lts.: 1953, 1983. .
 Macmillan, Neil. An A–Z of Type Designers. Yale University Press: 2006. .
 Williams, Owen Berthold Wolpe and His Typeface Albertus Letter Arts Review, Vol 20 No 1, 2006

External links 
 Albertus Pro
 Albertus at Monotype
 Albertus Font Family - by Berthold Wolpe
 A028: an open-source digitisation of regular and bold roman styles

Incised typefaces
Letterpress typefaces
Photocomposition typefaces
Digital typefaces
Monotype typefaces
Display typefaces
Typefaces and fonts introduced in the 1930s